DXBB (98.5 FM), broadcasting as 98.5 Wild FM, is a radio station owned and operated by UM Broadcasting Network. The station's studio and transmitter are located at 2nd floor, Laurente Bldg., J.C. Aquino Avenue, Brgy. Tandang Sora, Butuan.

References

External links
Wild FM Butuan FB Page

Radio stations in Butuan
Radio stations established in 1995